Golden Ball may refer to:

Awards
 Golden Ball Award, FIFA competition award for best player of tournament
 FIFA World Cup Golden Ball, FIFA World Cup award for best player of tournament
 FIFA U-20 World Cup Golden Ball, FIFA U-20 World Cup award for best player of tournament
 FIFA U-17 World Cup Golden Ball, FIFA U-20 World Cup award for best player of tournament
 FIFA Women's World Cup Golden Ball, FIFA Women's World Cup award for best player of tournament
 FIFA U-20 Women's World Cup Golden Ball, FIFA U-20 Women's World Cup award for best player of tournament
 FIFA U-17 Women's World Cup Golden Ball, FIFA U-17 Women's World Cup award for best player of tournament
 FIFA Club World Cup Golden Ball, FIFA Club World Cup award for best player of tournament
 FIFA Confederations Cup Golden Ball, FIFA Confederations Cup award for best player of tournament

 Ballon d'Or, an international annual association football award
 FIFA Ballon d'Or (2010–2015), annual association football award created with the merger of Ballon d'Or and FIFA World Player of the Year between 2010 and 2015
 Golden Ball (Czech Republic), association football award
 , annual association football award
 Portuguese Golden Ball, annual association football award
 Vietnamese Golden Ball, annual association football award

Other
 Golden Ball (St. Paul's Churchyard), a historical bookseller in London
 Golden Ball, Poulton-le-Fylde, a pub and hotel in England
 Golden Ball, York, a pub in York, England
 Echinocactus grusonii, or Golden Ball cactus, a critically endangered species
 Edward Hughes Ball Hughes, an English dandy of the Regency period, nicknamed 'The Golden Ball'
 Golden Ball (stadium), an Irish association football stadium and home ground for Wayside Celtic F.C.
 The Golden Ball and Other Stories, a short story collection by Agatha Christie

See also
 Golden Balls (disambiguation)